Apareiodon affinis, the darter characine, is a species of fresh water ray-finned fish native to the Río de la Plata Basin in southern Brazil, Paraguay and northern Argentina.

Description
Like other characids, it has a mouth on the underside of the head with a poorly developed upper lip. There are no dentary teeth and the pectoral fins have a single, unbranched fin-ray which the fish uses to prop itself up on the substrate.

Ecology
The darter characine is an open water fish, and was one of several fish species in a reservoir on the Paraná River  to thrive when large submerged macrophytes were removed. The diet consists of diatoms, green algae and the periderm of aquatic vegetation, perhaps removed accidentally while the fish scrapes off the algae.

The karyotype of this fish varies between populations. In the Upper Paraná basin, the sexes have distinct diploid numbers, the males showing 2n = 54 and the females 2n = 55. They have a multifactorial ZW sex-determination system where the female is determined by ZW1W2 and the male by ZZ. In the separate Cuiabá River system, all individuals show 2n = 54. This is a non-migratory species and its reproductive strategy involves external fertilisation and a lack of parental care of eggs or young.

References

Parodontidae
Taxa named by Franz Steindachner
Fish described in 1879